Canterbury Comes to London: Live from Astoria is a live album by the progressive rock band Caravan from 17 September 1997 at The Astoria, London, being released 20 April 1999.

Track listing 

"Memory Lain" (Pye Hastings) – 5:04
"Headloss" (Pye Hastings) – 4:53
"Nine Feet Underground" (Coughlan, Hastings, D. Sinclair, R. Sinclair) – 17:33
"The Dog, the Dog, He's at It Again" (Pye Hastings) – 6:28
"Cold as Ice" (Pye Hastings) – 5:47
"Somewhere in Your Heart" (Pye Hastings) – 5:39
"I Know Why You're Laughing" (Pye Hastings) – 5:47
"Liar" (Pye Hastings) – 6:42
"For Richard" (Coughlan, Hastings, D. Sinclair, R. Sinclair) – 11:04
"Golf Girl" (Coughlan, Hastings, D. Sinclair, R. Sinclair) – 7:08

Personnel 
Caravan
 Pye Hastings – vocals, guitar
 Doug Boyle – guitar
 Geoffrey Richardson – flute, mandolin, viola, spoons
 Dave Sinclair – keyboards
 Jim Leverton – bass, vocals
 Richard Coughlan – drums
 Simon Bentall – percussion

References

External links 
 Caravan - Canterbury Comes to London: Live from Astoria album review by Lindsay Planer, credits & releases at AllMusic.com
 Caravan - Canterbury Comes to London: Live from Astoria album releases & credits at Discogs.com
 Caravan - Canterbury Comes to London: Live from Astoria album to be listened as stream at Play.Spotify.com

1999 live albums
Caravan (band) live albums
Transatlantic Records live albums